Saint Martin de Porres High School is a private Jesuit-run Catholic high school in the St. Clair-Superior neighborhood on the East Side of Cleveland, Ohio.

Background
Saint Martin de Porres High School was established in 2004 as a part of the Cristo Rey Network of work-study University-preparatory schools. Students are only accepted if their family's income is at or below 200 percent of the federal poverty level, and most are one to two years behind their grade level.

At Saint Martin about one third of the tuition is covered by the educational voucher system in Ohio, but the corporate internship share is greater and allows for a superior level of education. In 2017 Saint Martin responded to the demand to educate more students and undertook a $30 million rebuilding project that would raise its capacity to 525 students. The new building facilitated a student-centered, project-based way of learning.

Campus ministry and service
There are liturgical celebrations throughout the year which are a part of the spiritual program for all students. In the first three years all students experience a day-long retreat, and in senior year an overnight retreat. Additionally, Kairos and men's/women's overnight retreats are optional.

All students are taught the Christian spirituality of service and participate in service-learning projects in the outside community. Also, special immersion opportunities are offered, 
as in Cleveland, West Virginia, New Orleans, and El Salvador. Other voluntary projects include the St. Philip Neri Hot meal Program, the Store Front Drop-in Center, United Cerebral Palsy, and St. Clair Superior Development Corporation. In addition, some school clubs include a service component in their activities.

Activities
     
Peer Mediation
Women's Circle
Yearbook Club
Student Senate
Poetry Club
 
Prom Line-Up
Prom Planning Committee
Quake (Step Team)
Robotics & Programming
Youth in Government (YIG)
 
Nature Club/Outdoor Experiences
Saint Martin Recruiting Force (SMRFs)
Student Advocates for Social Justice (SASJ)
Photography Experiences (Project SnapShot)
Students in Free Enterprise (SIFE) / Investment Club

Athletics
        
JV volleyball
Varsity volleyball
Varsity soccer (Co-ed)

Cross country (boys & girls)
JV & varsity boys basketball
Varsity girls basketball

Varsity baseball
Varsity softball
 Cross Country (Co-Ed)
Track & field (boys and girls)

References

External links

 School website
Cristo Rey Network
 Collegiate partners - Cristo Rey Network
 Fr. John P. Foley honored with Presidential Citizen's Medal
60 minutes
Cristo Rey Featured in WashPost column by George Will
 Boston Globe - With sense of purpose, students cut class for a day 
 Bill & Melinda Gates Foundation - Success of Innovative Urban Catholic School Sparks Major Investment

Jesuit high schools in the United States
St. Clair-Superior
High schools in Cuyahoga County, Ohio
Catholic secondary schools in Ohio
Education in Cleveland
Poverty-related organizations
Educational institutions established in 2004
Cristo Rey Network
2004 establishments in Ohio